WSMC-FM (90.5 MHz) is a public FM radio station featuring a classical music radio format. It is licensed to Collegedale, Tennessee, and serves the Chattanooga metropolitan area, as well as parts of Tennessee, Georgia, Alabama and North Carolina.  WSMC-FM is owned by Southern Adventist University (SAU).  Saturday evening through Friday afternoon, it airs classical music including opera and similar genres.  Christian radio programming is heard from Friday evening to Saturday afternoon.  WSMC has only three full-time employees: the general manager, corporate sales manager, and operations manager. The announcers and production staff consist entirely of SAU students.

WSMC-FM has an effective radiated power (ERP) of 100,000 watts, currently the maximum power for American FM stations.  Programming can also be heard on FM translator W217AW at 91.3 MHz in Dalton, Georgia.

History

Early years
In , WSMC-FM first signed on the air.  Originally on 88.1 FM, it moved to 90.7 in 1967 and to 90.3 in 1990. For years, its signal was spotty at best in downtown Chattanooga. However, in 1990, it moved from its original tower on White Oak Mountain to a new tower on Mowbray Mountain in Soddy-Daisy, allowing it better coverage of the Chattanooga radio market.  

The call sign stands for Southern Missionary College, SAU's name at the time the station began operations.

Religious programming controversies
In 1971, WSMC became one of the charter members of NPR.  However, because of the religious doctrine of the licensee's church body, the General Conference of Seventh-day Adventists, WSMC cannot air live news programming from sunset on Friday evening until sunset on Saturday evening. This frequently resulted in NPR's afternoon drive time program, All Things Considered, being interrupted in progress.  That situation did not sit well with NPR during the 1990s.

Coinciding with this dispute, a citizens' group called "Chattanoogans for Better Public Radio" took exception to what group organizer Bob Steverson described as the "awkward marriage of convenience" between WSMC and NPR. Most of NPR's funding comes from the Corporation for Public Broadcasting, itself subsidized by Federal appropriations. From sunset on Friday evening to sunset on Saturday evening, WSMC aired a variety of local and national religious programs. The groups complained that it was inappropriate for WSMC to receive federal funding, since it aired hours of religious programming each week. Some individuals also alleged that the religious programming, mandated by the administration of what was then Southern College of Seventh-day Adventists, amounted to catering to a religious minority at the expense of the larger public in the Tennessee Valley.

In March 1995, WSMC formed a community advisory board to address these concerns. However, as Steverson's group saw it, Southern College had three options:  stop preempting NPR programming, move NPR programming to the area's other NPR member station, WUTC, or give up its license to another owner. In June 1995, NPR officials began the process of terminating WSMC's membership on the grounds that the station preempted NPR programming too often and aired too much religious programming. In response, college officials and station management decided to take action themselves, discontinuing most NPR programming, news included, taking effect on September 30, 1995. Replacing ATC were Public Radio International's The World and American Public Media's Marketplace, which could air on a delayed basis or be preempted on Fridays.  A few NPR programs remained on the schedule (purchased separately without a network discount).  Most of the other programs moved to WUTC, which replaced WSMC as the Chattanooga market's primary NPR station.  WSMC has since dropped most NPR programming from its schedule, though it does still air some NPR news updates.

Programming
Except for the religious shows on Friday evenings and in the daytime on Saturdays (the 24-hour period of observance for Seventh-day Adventists), WSMC's programming consists entirely of classical music and derived genres.  WSMC is less diverse than a typical public radio station, targeting an older, more conservative listenership. By contrast, 88.1 WUTC carries mostly news and talk programs furnished by NPR and other public radio suppliers.

Some national classical shows from NPR and other programming sources includes Performance Today, From the Top, Pipedreams
and Sunday Baroque

.

See also

 Media ministries of the Seventh-day Adventist Church

References

Notes
1995 report on listener dissatisfaction over religious programming on WSMC
Report on WSMC's discontinuing full membership in NPR

External links
WSMC-FM official website

SMC
Seventh-day Adventist media
Classical music radio stations in the United States
Southern Adventist University
NPR member stations
Radio stations established in 1961
1961 establishments in Tennessee